Learned is an American surname, and may refer to such notable people as:

 Allan Learned, interim head football coach of the Virginia Tech Hokies for the end of the 1950 season
 Amasa Learned (1750–1825), American politician
 Ebenezer Learned (1728–1801), Continental Army general
 Michael Learned (born 1939), American actress
 Stanley Learned (1899–1975), third president of Phillips Petroleum Company